I by Day, You by Night is a 1932 German musical comedy film directed by Ludwig Berger and starring Käthe von Nagy and Willy Fritsch. It was shot at the Babelsberg Studios and on location at the Sanssouci Palace in Potsdam. The film's sets were designed by the art director Otto Hunte. It premiered in Berlin on 29 November 1932.

As was common at the time separate English- and French-language versions were released, both directed by Berger.  The British version Early to Bed was co-produced with Gaumont British. The plot is very similar to the 1933 American film, Rafter Romance and it's 1937 remake, Living on Love, though these films are based on a 1932 novel also named "Rafter Romance".

Synopsis
Greta, a manicurist, and Hans, a waiter, share the same room which he uses in the day and she at night due to their different working hours. Although they have never met they strongly dislike the other. However, when they meet at last they fall in love with realising the identity of the other.

Cast
 Käthe von Nagy as Grete
 Willy Fritsch as Hans
 Amanda Lindner as Cornelia Seidelbast
 Julius Falkenstein as Herr Krüger
 Elisabeth Lennartz as Trude Krüger
 Albert Lieven as Wolf
 Friedrich Gnaß as Helmut
 Anton Pointner as Meyer
 Eugen Rex as Peschke
 Ida Wüst as Frau Waiser
 Ursula van Diemen as Filmdarstellerin
 Walther Ludwig as Filmdarsteller
 Helmut Forest as Straßensänger
 Carl Merznicht as Straßensänger
 Trude Lieske as Gretes Kollegin
 Gerhard Bienert as Polizist
 Karl Hellmer as Kellner
 Rudolf Platte as Kuchenkellner
 Werner Pledath as Geschäftsführer im 'Casanova'
 Leo Monosson as Sänger im 'Casanova'
 Comedian Harmonists as Themselves

References

Bibliography

External links
 

1932 films
1932 musical comedy films
Films of the Weimar Republic
German musical comedy films
1930s German-language films
German multilingual films
Films directed by Ludwig Berger
Operetta films
German black-and-white films
UFA GmbH films
Films produced by Erich Pommer
Films with screenplays by Hans Székely
1932 multilingual films
Films shot at Babelsberg Studios
1930s German films